Fredrik Auke (born 12 February 1990), also known as Freddy Kalas and previously as Freddy Genius, is a Norwegian singer signed to Alter Ego Music. His debut hit "Pinne for landet" topped VG lista, the official Norwegian Singles Chart. The follow-up "Hey Ho" made it to number 2 on the same chart. He is the brother of Simen Auke from the DJ duo Broiler.

In 2016, he took part in the preselection for Norwegian Melodi Grand Prix in a bid to represent Norway in Eurovision Song Contest 2016 with "Feel Da Rush". He reached the final four in the preselection process finishing runner-up to the winning song "Icebreaker" by Agnete. Kalas' song proved popular with the public making it to number 2 on the Norwegian Singles Chart.

Discography

Singles
As main artist

As featuring artist

Awards and nominations

References

Norwegian pop singers
Musicians from Drammen
1990 births
Living people
Melodi Grand Prix contestants
Norwegian singer-songwriters
21st-century Norwegian singers
21st-century Norwegian male singers